This is a list of Killinaskully episodes. The show, created by and starring comedian Pat Shortt in a number of roles, aired on RTÉ in the 2000s.

Series one (2004)

1. This episode was originally entitled "The Teacher".

Series two (2005)

"Behind The Scenes at Killinaskully"

A making-of feature on the second season. It aired 13 November 2005

Series three (2006)

Series four (2007)

Series five (2008)

References

External links
 Killinaskully at RTÉ Television

Irish comedy television shows
RTÉ original programming